Zyuzino District is an administrative district (raion), one of the twelve in South-Western Administrative Okrug of the federal city of Moscow, Russia.  As of the 2010 Census, the total population of the district was 123,003.

Geography
The area of the district is 545.04 ha. The area of the housing stock is 2132.3 thousand m² (2010). From the south, the district borders on the Bitsevsky Forest Park, and in the north, the Kotlovka River flows. The streets of the district are named after the cities of the Crimea and the Black Sea, as well as the Moscow metro stations located in the Zyuzino area - Nakhimovsky Prospekt, Sevastopolskaya, Kakhovskaya. There are three ponds on the territory of the district, one of which has natural banks. There are many squares, boulevards and alleys in the area. In 2014, Zyuzino Park was equipped as part of the city greening program.

Municipal status
As a municipal division, it is incorporated as Zyuzino Municipal Okrug.

Transport
Zyuzino has a 24-hours tramway connection to Moscow center (Tram #3)

See also
 Moscow children's ecological and biological center

References

Notes

Sources

Districts of Moscow
South-Western Administrative Okrug
